Vanilla odorata is a species of flowering plant in the family Orchidaceae, native to southern Mexico, Central America, and tropical South America. With Vanilla planifolia it may be a parent of the vanilla crop species Vanilla tahitensis.

References

odorata
Flora of Southwestern Mexico
Flora of Southeastern Mexico
Flora of Veracruz
Flora of Central America
Flora of western South America
Flora of northern South America
Flora of North Brazil
Flora of Northeast Brazil
Plants described in 1827